Allison Burnett (born December 16, 1958) is an American screenwriter, film director, and novelist.

Early life and education 

Allison Burnett was born in Ithaca, New York. He graduated from Northwestern University in Evanston, Illinois before attending Juilliard where he studied playwriting.

Film

1990s 

Burnett's first screenplay to be produced was the kick-boxing prison drama, Bloodfist III: Forced to Fight (1992), which he co-wrote with Charles Mattera.  He also wrote Gregory Hines' directorial debut, Bleeding Hearts (1994), and the film Red Meat (1997), which he directed, starring John Slattery, Jennifer Grey, and Lara Flynn Boyle.

2000s 

Burnett's next film was Autumn in New York (2000), starring Richard Gere and Winona Ryder. This was followed by the Lifetime Original Movie Perfect Romance (2004), Feast of Love (2007) based on the book by Charles Baxter and starring Morgan Freeman and Greg Kinnear, and Resurrecting the Champ (2007), written with Michael Bortman and starring Samuel L. Jackson and Josh Hartnett. In 2008, Burnett wrote, with Robert Fyvolent and Mark Brinker, the crime thriller Untraceable (2008) starring Diane Lane. The following year, Burnett wrote the remake of Fame.

2010s 

Burnett had two films released in 2012. The first was Underworld Awakening (2012), co-written with Len Wiseman, John Hlavin, and J. Michael Straczynski, the fourth film in the Underworld series starring Kate Beckinsale. The following month, Gone (2012) was released, starring Amanda Seyfried.

In 2013 Burnett directed his second film, Ask Me Anything (2013) based on his novel Undiscovered Gyrl. The film stars Britt Robertson, Justin Long, Christian Slater, Robert Patrick, and Martin Sheen.

In 2019 Burnett directed the sequel to Ask Me Anything, Another Girl, starring Sammi Hanratty and Peter Gadiot, based on his 2015 novella of the same name.

Fiction 

Burnett's first novel, Christopher: A Tale of Seduction was published in 2003 by Broadway Books. It was a finalist for the 2004 Pen Center Literary Award.

In 2006, Burnett wrote a sequel to Christopher titled The House Beautiful, published by Carroll & Graf, followed in 2009 by the novel Undiscovered Gyrl, published by Vintage Books.

In 2011 Burnett wrote the second sequel to his novel Christopher, titled Death By Sunshine, published by Writers Tribe Books.

Burnett released his fifth novel, The Escape of Malcolm Poe in 2014. He released a sequel novella to Undiscovered Gyrl, titled Another Girl, in 2015.

Filmography

Novels

References

External links 
 Allison Burnett at Official Site
 

1958 births
Living people
American male screenwriters
Writers from Ithaca, New York
Northwestern University alumni
Juilliard School alumni
Film directors from New York (state)
21st-century American novelists
American male novelists
21st-century American male writers
Novelists from New York (state)
Screenwriters from New York (state)
21st-century American screenwriters